Lee Hae-in (born July 4, 1994) is a South Korean singer and actress. She is a former contestant on Produce 101 and a member of I.B.I, a girl group formed by LOEN Entertainment in August 2016. In 2017, she appeared as a contestant on another girl group competition, Idol School.

Career

In 2019, following the Mnet vote manipulation investigation, Lee's father alleged through her fan site that CJ ENM suggested during her audition that she sign with their subsidiary agency to ensure that she would be able to debut after elimination, and she had done so out of fear of not being accepted into Idol School. However, after being eliminated, CJ ENM did not follow up and she was unable to sign contracts with other agencies. In response, CJ ENM issued an apology. Following the news, Lee revealed on Instagram and on PD Note the poor conditions she and other contestants worked under.

Discography

Singles

As a featured artist

Filmography

Television series

Television drama

References

External links

 

1994 births
Living people
Kakao M artists
K-pop singers
South Korean women pop singers
South Korean contemporary R&B singers
South Korean dance musicians
South Korean television actresses
South Korean female idols
People from Changwon
Produce 101 contestants
21st-century South Korean singers
Hanlim Multi Art School alumni
21st-century South Korean women singers
21st-century South Korean actresses